Christopher Anthony Brathwaite (August 12, 1948 – November 12, 1984) was an athlete from Trinidad and Tobago who specialized in the 100 and 200 metres.

He was born in Maraval, Trinidad and attended East New Mexico University, Spokane Community College and University of Oregon, from where he graduated with a BA and MA in sociology. He was Trinidad and Tobago 100/200 metres champion in 1978, and he won these titles again in 1983.

He competed in two Olympic Games where he reached the semi-final of the 100 metres at the 1980 Moscow  Olympics, and the quarter final of the 200 metres. He also competed at the inaugural World Championships in Helsinki.

Chris Brathwaite died on November 12, 1984 having received gunshot wounds from sniper fire while running in Eugene, Oregon. The perpetrator, who later committed suicide, was found to have used cocaine prior to the shooting. About 400 people attended the funeral.

Achievements

References

External links
Best of Trinidad

1948 births
1984 deaths
Trinidad and Tobago male sprinters
Athletes (track and field) at the 1976 Summer Olympics
Athletes (track and field) at the 1980 Summer Olympics
Olympic athletes of Trinidad and Tobago
Athletes (track and field) at the 1978 Commonwealth Games
Athletes (track and field) at the 1982 Commonwealth Games
Commonwealth Games medallists in athletics
Athletes (track and field) at the 1975 Pan American Games
Athletes (track and field) at the 1983 Pan American Games
Pan American Games competitors for Trinidad and Tobago
Male murder victims
Trinidad and Tobago people murdered abroad
People murdered in Oregon
Deaths by firearm in Oregon
Commonwealth Games silver medallists for Trinidad and Tobago
Competitors at the 1970 Central American and Caribbean Games
Competitors at the 1982 Central American and Caribbean Games
University of Oregon alumni
Medallists at the 1978 Commonwealth Games